Ghazala Shaheen (born 1 February 1981) is a Pakistani politician who was a Member of the Provincial Assembly of the Punjab, from May 2013 to May 2018.

Early life and education
Ghazala was born on 1 February 1981 in Haroonabad, Bahawalnagar.

She has completed intermediate level education.

Political career

She was elected to the Provincial Assembly of the Punjab as a candidate of Pakistan Muslim League (Z) on a reserved seat for women in 2013 Pakistani general election.

References

Living people
Punjab MPAs 2013–2018
1981 births
Pakistan Muslim League (Z) politicians